{{DISPLAYTITLE:Malate dehydrogenase (NADP+)}}

In enzymology, a malate dehydrogenase (NADP+) is an enzyme that catalyzes the chemical reaction

(S)-malate + NADP+  oxaloacetate + NADPH + H+

Thus, the two substrates of this enzyme are (S)-malate and NADP+, whereas its 3 products are oxaloacetate, NADPH, and H+.

This enzyme belongs to the family of oxidoreductases, specifically those acting on the CH-OH group of donor with NAD+ or NADP+ as acceptor. The systematic name of this enzyme class is (S)-malate:NADP+ oxidoreductase. Other names in common use include NADP+-malic enzyme, NADP+-malate dehydrogenase, malic dehydrogenase (nicotinamide adenine dinucleotide phosphate), malate NADP+ dehydrogenase, NADP+ malate dehydrogenase, NADP+-linked malate dehydrogenase, and malate dehydrogenase (NADP+). This enzyme participates in pyruvate metabolism and carbon fixation. This enzyme has at least one effector, hn.

Structural studies

References

 
 
 

EC 1.1.1
NADPH-dependent enzymes
Enzymes of known structure